The Chinese Bungalow is a 1925 play by Marion Osmond and James Corbet, based on Osmond's 1923 novel; it is a three-act melodrama set in the Far East. It was adapted for film in 1926, in 1930, and again in 1940.

References

English plays
British plays adapted into films
1925 plays
West End plays